The 9th Thailand National Games (Thai: กีฬาเขตแห่งประเทศไทย ครั้งที่ 9, also known as the 1975 National Games and the 1975 Interprovincial Games) were held in Lopburi, Thailand from 28 November to 4 December 1975, with contests in 14 sports and athletes from 10 regions.

Emblem
The emblem of 1975 Thailand National Games was the blue circle, with the Phra Prang Sam Yod, the temple in Lopburi on top, the emblem of Sports Authority of Thailand on the inside, and surrounded by the text

Participating regions
The 9th Thailand National Games represented 10 regions from 71 provinces.

Sports
The 1975 Thailand National Games featured 10 Olympic sports contested at the 1975 Southeast Asian Peninsular Games, 1978 Asian Games and 1976 Summer Olympics. In addition, four non-Olympic sports were featured: badminton, sepak takraw, table tennis and tennis.

References

External links
 Sports Authority of Thailand (SAT)

National Games
Thailand National Games
National Games
Thailand National Games
National Games